In tennis, the 2016 US Open Series (known as Emirates Airline US Open Series for sponsorship reasons) was the thirteenth edition of the US Open Series, which included a group of hard court tournaments that started on July 18, 2016 in Stanford and concluded in Connecticut for the women and in Winston Salem for the men on August 27, 2016. This edition consisted of three separate men's tournaments and three women's tournaments, with the Western & Southern Open hosting both a men's and women's event. The series was headlined by two ATP World Tour Masters 1000 and two WTA Premier 5 events.

Point distribution for series events
In order to be included in the final standings and subsequently the bonus prize money, a player needs to have countable results from at least two different tournaments. Starting from the 2014 season, a new rule has been added to double the points of a player who has obtained countable results in at least three tournaments.

The top three men’s and top three women’s finishers all earn bonus prize money at the US Open, with the champions of the Series Bonus Challenge having the opportunity to win $1 million in bonus prize money in Flushing Meadows.

Standings

ATP

Notes:
1 – Tours – Number of tournaments in US Open Series in which a player has reached the quarterfinals or better, in 250 series events, or the Round of 16 in ATP World Tour Masters 1000 events.
 # –  Indicates a player has earned points in at least three Emirates Airline US Open Series events, therefore doubling his point total earned on the Series.
 In order to be counted in the final standings, a player must earn points in two or more Emirates Airline US Open Series events.

WTA

Notes:

1 – Tours – Number of tournaments in US Open Series in which a player has reached the quarterfinals or better, in Premier events; or the Round of 16 or better in Premier 5 events.
 # –  Indicates a player has earned points in at least three Emirates Airline US Open Series events, therefore doubling her point total earned on the Series.
 In order to be counted in the final standings, a player must earn points in two or more Emirates Airline US Open Series events.

Bonus prize money
Top three players in the 2016 US Open Series will receive bonus prize money, depending on where they finish in the 2016 US Open, according to money schedule below.

Tournament Schedule

Week 1

WTA – Bank of the West Classic (Stanford)

Angelique Kerber was the defending champion, but chose to compete in Båstad instead. Venus Williams was the number one seed. Catherine Bellis reached the quarterfinals of a WTA Premier tournament for the first time in her career, where she lost to Venus Williams.Johanna Konta won her first WTA title, defeating Williams in the final, 7–5, 5–7, 6–2. Williams was attempting to win her 3rd title in Stanford and her 50th title overall.

Main Draw Finals

Week 2

ATP – Rogers Cup (Toronto)

Andy Murray was the defending champion, but chose not to participate this year, citing a need to recover from recent tournaments.

Novak Djokovic won his 30th Masters 1000 title, defeating Kei Nishikori in the final, 6–3, 7–5. By reaching his 43rd Masters 1000 final, Djokovic broke the record he previously shared with Roger Federer and Rafael Nadal.

Main Draw Finals

WTA – Rogers Cup (Montreal)

Belinda Bencic was the defending champion, but withdrew with a left wrist injury before the tournament began. Number one seed Serena Williams also withdrew prior to the tournament beginning.

Simona Halep won her fifth WTA Premier tournament, defeating Madison Keys in the final, 7–6(7–2), 6–3.The win also moved Halep to the top of the US Open Series standings.

Main Draw Finals

Week 3

ATP – BB&T Atlanta Open

John Isner was the three-time defending champion, but lost in the final to Nick Kyrgios, 6–7(3–7), 6–7(4–7).

Main Draw Finals

Week 4

ATP – Western & Southern Open (Cincinnati) 

Roger Federer was the two-time defending champion, but withdrew because of a knee injury.

Marin Čilić won his maiden Masters 1000 title by defeating Andy Murray in the final, 6–4, 7–5, ending his streak of 22-straight match wins dating back to the Queen's Club Championships.

Main Draw Finals

WTA – Western & Southern Open (Cincinnati) 

Angelique Kerber was in contention for the world No. 1 ranking, which she would have attained had she won the title. However, by losing in the final she remained No. 2.

Karolína Plíšková won her first WTA Premier singles title, defeating Kerber in the final, 6–3, 6–1.

Main Draw Finals

Week 5

ATP – Winston-Salem Open 

Kevin Anderson was the defending champion, but lost in the second round to Jiří Veselý.

Pablo Carreño Busta won the title, defeating Roberto Bautista Agut in the final, 6–7(6–8), 7–6(7–1), 6–4.

Main Draw Finals

WTA – Connecticut Open (New Haven)

Petra Kvitová was the two-time defending champion, but lost in the semifinals to Agnieszka Radwańska.

Agnieszka Radwańska won the title, defeating Elina Svitolina in the final, 6–1, 7–6(7–3).

Main Draw Finals

Weeks 6–7

ATP – US Open (New York)

Main Draw Finals

WTA – US Open (New York)

Main Draw Finals

References

External links